Romana Maláčová (born 15 May 1987, in Brno) is a Czech athlete who specialises in the pole vault. She represented her country at the 2009 World Championships without qualifying for the final. In addition, she competed at three outdoor and two indoor European Championships.

Her personal bests in the event are 4.50 metres outdoors (Prague 2014) and 4.62 metres indoors (Clermont-Ferrand 2016).

Competition record

References

1987 births
Living people
Czech female pole vaulters
Sportspeople from Brno
World Athletics Championships athletes for the Czech Republic
Athletes (track and field) at the 2016 Summer Olympics
Olympic athletes of the Czech Republic
Czech Athletics Championships winners
Competitors at the 2011 Summer Universiade
Competitors at the 2013 Summer Universiade
Competitors at the 2015 Summer Universiade
Athletes (track and field) at the 2020 Summer Olympics